Cymbium marmoratum, commonly known as the marble cymbium volute, is a species of sea snail, a marine gastropod mollusk in the family Volutidae, the volutes.

Description

Distribution

Gallery

References

External links

Volutidae
Gastropods described in 1807